Margaret "Meg" McDonald is an American voice actress working for Seraphim Digital/Sentai Filmworks and Funimation. Some of McDonald's major roles in anime are Rikka Takanashi from the Love, Chunibyo & Other Delusions series, Miho Nishizumi in Girls und Panzer, Saika Totsuka in the My Youth Romantic Comedy Is Wrong, As I Expected series, Mei Sagara in Nakaimo - My Sister Is Among Them!, Haruka Saigusa in Little Busters!, Harumi Taniguchi in Citrus and Tamako Kitashirakawa in Tamako Market.

Anime

Film

References

External links
 
 

American voice actresses
Living people
21st-century American actresses
People from Sugar Land, Texas
Year of birth missing (living people)